The 2023 Nigerian presidential election in Anambra State was held on 25 February 2023 as part of the nationwide 2023 Nigerian presidential election to elect the president and vice president of Nigeria. Other federal elections, including elections to the House of Representatives and the Senate, will also be held on the same date while state elections will be held two weeks afterward on 11 March.

Background
Anambra State is a small, Igbo-majority southeastern state; although it is one of the most developed states in the nation, Anambra has faced challenges in security as both the nationwide kidnapping epidemic and separatist violence have heavily affected the region. Originally launched ostensibly to defend ethnic Igbos from herdsmen and government attacks, the separatist organization Indigenous People of Biafra's Eastern Security Network began violently enforcing economically destructive weekly lockdowns in 2021 and swiftly were criticized for committing human rights abuses against civilians it was meant to protect. These atrocities coupled with law enforcement brutality and herder–farmer clashes worsened the security situation prior to the election.

Politically, the 2019 elections were categorized by competitive contests between the state PDP and APGA. Statewise, the majority of House of Assembly seats were won by APGA. The parties split the eleven House of Representatives seats with the PDP winning 6 seats and APGA winning 5 seats while two senate seats went to the PDP and one seat was gained by the YPP. For the presidency, Anambra was easily won by PDP nominee Atiku Abubakar by an 81% margin of victory.

Polling

Projections

General election

Results

By senatorial district 
The results of the election by senatorial district.

By federal constituency
The results of the election by federal constituency.

By local government area 
The results of the election by local government area.

See also 
 2023 Nigerian elections
 2023 Nigerian presidential election

Notes

References 

presidential election in Anambra State
2023 Anambra State elections
Anambra